The Honcharuk government was formed on 29 August 2019, and was led by Oleksiy Honcharuk. It was the fourth Ukrainian cabinet formed since the 2014 Ukrainian revolution, following the 2019 Ukrainian parliamentary election.

History

Appointment of Honcharuk as Prime Minister 
The appointment of Honcharuk as the Prime Minister of Ukraine was approved by the Verkhovna Rada (Ukraine's parliament) on 29 August 2019. Honcharuk at the time of his appointment was a deputy chairperson of the Presidential Office of Ukraine. 290 People's deputies voted for his candidacy, while the members of most of the other factions (Opposition Platform — For Life, European Solidarity, Fatherland, and Voice) did not support it.

From the podium, the newly elected Prime Minister stated that in the upcoming years, each third hryvnia would go towards settling debts. The Prime Minister considered that the main indicator of business attractiveness had to become access to cheaper resources. Honcharuk promised to take control of the credit rate and Ukraine's image. He considered that credit with a 12-13 annual percentage rate is a reality. At the time of Honcharuk's appointment, 10 million Ukrainians lived below the poverty line and corruption continued to flourish.

Criticism
 Opposition Platform — For Life said that the main task of the Prime Minister should not be Ukraine's image nor its economic development but ending the War in Donbass.
 European Solidarity questioned the transparency of the selection of the Prime Minister candidate.
 The leader of Fatherland, Yulia Tymoshenko told journalists on 29 August 2019 that even though her party did not support the appointment of Honcharuk, her party would support the government (working outside the majority) and would not sit on the opposition benches. Less than three months later, the party moved into opposition due to its disagreement with the government's plan to remove the long-standing moratorium on selling agricultural land.
 Voice did not support the appointment of Honcharuk as Prime Minister because it was not informed about the composition of the rest of the government.

Appointment of Bakanov to lead the Security Service of Ukraine
On 29 August 2019, the Ukrainian parliament also approved the appointment of Ivan Bakanov as Head of the Security Service of Ukraine.

Appointment of Riaboshapka to lead the General Prosecutor's Office
Ruslan Riaboshapka replaced Yuriy Lutsenko as Prosecutor General of Ukraine on 29 August 2019.

Parliamentary vote for the cabinet

Appointment of Prystaiko as Minister of Foreign Affairs

Appointment of Zahorodniuk as Minister of Defence

Retention of Avakov in the new government
One of the most acute issues that were part of long discussions and negotiations was keeping the Minister of Internal Affairs Arsen Avakov who had held his post since the Revolution of Dignity. The newly elected Prime Minister Honcharuk noted that the decision to keep the minister was one of the most complex, yet for the Minister of Internal Affairs "drew certain red lines" which he could not cross.

Fall
In early 2020, domestic media outlets reported that President Volodymyr Zelensky had lost confidence in Prime Minister Honcharuk due to the slow speed at which his government was carrying out reforms. Ukrainian media expected this lack of confidence would culminate in a vote in the Verkhovna Rada on March 4 in which Zelensky would propose sweeping changes to the government, including the appointment of a new prime minister.

On 3 March 2020 Honcharuk tendered his resignation and according to Ukrainian law the Prime Minister's resignation meant the automatic resignation of the entire government. Speaking before the vote on Honcharuk's dismissal, President Zelensky thanked him for his work, while blaming his government for an inefficient economic policy, a decline in industrial production and customs revenues, and accused them of poor communication with local authorities and the public, as well as failing to prepare for further reforms. The following day the Honcharuk government was replaced by the Shmyhal Government.

Composition 
The new government was cut to 17 ministers from the previous 25. The new cabinet was cut to 15 ministers from the previous 19.

Under the Constitution of Ukraine, the President of Ukraine submits nominations to parliament for the post of Minister of Foreign Affairs and Minister of Defense.

According to Ukrayinska Pravda, President Volodymyr Zelensky continued to hold interviews with candidates for Minister of Healthcare on the day the cabinet was appointed. On 31 August 2019, Servant of the People faction leader Davyd Arakhamia stated on ZIK channel that most likely the then current Healthcare Minister, Zoriana Skaletska, would be replaced by Mikhail Radutsky (who according to Arakhamia needed "about three months to prepare" for the post (in August 2019).

Servant of the People appointed five of its members on the party election list (who are not actual members of the party) as ministers in the Honcharuk government.

On 4 February 2020 Minister of Regional Development Aliona Babak was replaced by Denys Shmygal at her own request.

See also
 9th Ukrainian Verkhovna Rada

Notes

References

Ukrainian governments
9th Ukrainian Verkhovna Rada
Cabinets established in 2019
2019 establishments in Ukraine
Cabinets disestablished in 2020
2020 disestablishments in Ukraine